Petersburg Borough is a borough in the U.S. state of Alaska.  According to the 2020 census, the population was 3,398. The borough seat is Petersburg.  Petersburg is the most recently created county equivalent in the United States.

History
When the borough incorporated in 2013, it took area from the Hoonah-Angoon Census Area and the former Petersburg Census Area.  The remaining portion of Petersburg Census Area (including Kake) was added to Prince of Wales-Hyder Census Area.  Petersburg Census Area was created in 2008 from the remaining portion of Wrangell-Petersburg Census Area upon the incorporation of the City and Borough of Wrangell.

Geography
Located in central Southeast Alaska, the Petersburg Borough encompasses approximately 3,829 square miles (2,921 square miles of land, 908 square miles of water).

Adjacent boroughs and census area
 Juneau Borough, Alaska - northwest (quadripoint)
 Wrangell Borough, Alaska - southeast
 Prince of Wales-Hyder Census Area, Alaska - southwest
 Hoonah–Angoon Census Area - north and west
 Regional District of Kitimat-Stikine, British Columbia, Canada - east

Demographics

As of the 2020 census, there were 3,398 people living in the borough. The population density was 0.89/sq mi (0.34/km2). There were 1,718 housing units. The racial makeup of the borough was 2,870 White, 92 Black or African American, 483 Native American, 209 Asian, 58 Pacific Islander, and 206 from other races. 164 of the population were Hispanic or Latino of any race.

Communities

City
 Kupreanof

Census-designated places
 Hobart Bay
 Petersburg

See also

 List of boroughs in Alaska

References

External links

 
 Petersburg Chamber of Commerce 
 Petersburg Public Access Atlas (Alaska DNR)
 Map of the former census area

 
2013 establishments in the United States
Populated places established in 2013